The rufous-banded honeyeater (Conopophila albogularis) is a species of bird in the family Meliphagidae. It is found in the Aru Islands, New Guinea and northern Australia. Its natural habitat is subtropical or tropical mangrove forests. The rufous-banded honeyeater is considered one of the most common small birds in the suburban ecosystem of Darwin, Australia, notable because its lack of introduced bird species. Ornithologist F. Salomonsen recognized two subspecies of rufous-banded honeyeater, Conopophila albogularis and Conopophila mimikae but J. Ford disagreed with this subspeciation.

References

rufous-banded honeyeater
Birds of New Guinea
Birds of the Aru Islands
Birds of the Northern Territory
Birds of Cape York Peninsula
rufous-banded honeyeater
Taxonomy articles created by Polbot
rufous-banded honeyeater